Albert Laurence Di Meola (born July 22, 1954) is an American guitarist. Known for his works in jazz fusion and world music, he began his career as a guitarist of the group Return to Forever in 1974. Between the 1970s and 1980s, albums such as Elegant Gypsy and Friday Night in San Francisco  earned him both critical and commercial success.

Early life
Born in Jersey City, New Jersey, into an Italian family with roots in Cerreto Sannita, a small town northeast of Benevento, Di Meola grew up in Bergenfield, where he attended Bergenfield High School. He has been a resident of Old Tappan, New Jersey.

When he was eight years old, he was inspired by Elvis Presley and the Ventures to start playing guitar. His teacher directed him toward jazz standards. He cites as influences jazz guitarists George Benson and Kenny Burrell and bluegrass and country guitarists Clarence White and Doc Watson.

Career

He attended Berklee College of Music in 1971. At nineteen, he was hired by Chick Corea to replace Bill Connors in the pioneering jazz fusion band Return to Forever with Stanley Clarke and Lenny White. He recorded three albums with Return to Forever, helping the quartet earn its greatest commercial success as all three albums cracked the Top 40 on the U.S. Billboard pop albums chart. 

As Return to Forever was disbanding around 1976, Di Meola began recording solo albums on which he demonstrated a mastery of jazz fusion, flamenco, and Mediterranean music. His album Elegant Gypsy (1977) received a gold certification. In 1980, he recorded the acoustic live album, Friday Night in San Francisco, with Paco de Lucía and John McLaughlin.

In the beginning of his career, as evidenced on his first solo album Land of the Midnight Sun (1976, on which Jaco Pastorius and the ex-members of RTF collaborated), Di Meola was noted for his technical mastery and extremely fast, complex guitar solos and compositions. But even on his early albums, he had begun to explore Mediterranean cultures and acoustic genres like flamenco. Notable examples are "Mediterranean Sundance" and "Lady of Rome, Sister of Brazil" from the Elegant Gypsy album (1977).

His early albums were influential among rock and jazz guitarists. Di Meola continued to explore Latin music within jazz fusion on Casino and Splendido Hotel. He exhibited a more subtle touch on acoustic numbers "Fantasia Suite for Two Guitars" from the Casino album and on the best-selling live album with McLaughlin and de Lucia, Friday Night in San Francisco. The latter album became one of the most popular live albums for acoustic guitar, selling more than two million copies worldwide.

In the mid-1980s, Di Meola began to incorporate the Synclavier guitar synthesizer into his compositions. Except for the occasional electric guitar foray on albums such as 1991's Kiss My Axe, he spent most of the next two decades exploring acoustic music and world music. He rediscovered his love of the electric guitar in 2006, and the DVD of his concert at the Leverkusen Jazz Festival 2006 is subtitled Return to Electric Guitar. In 2018, Di Meola was awarded an honorary doctorate of music from his alma mater, Berklee College of Music.

Discography

 1976 Land of the Midnight Sun (Columbia)
 1977 Elegant Gypsy (Columbia)
 1978 Casino (Columbia)
 1980 Splendido Hotel (Columbia)
 1981 Friday Night in San Francisco with John McLaughlin, Paco de Lucia (Columbia)
 1982 Tour De Force – Live (Columbia)
 1982 Electric Rendezvous (Columbia)
 1983 Passion, Grace & Fire with John McLaughlin, Paco de Lucia (Columbia)
 1983 Scenario (Columbia)
 1985 Cielo e Terra (Manhattan)
 1985 Soaring Through a Dream with Al Di Meola Project (Manhattan)
 1987 Tirami Su with Al Di Meola Project (Manhattan)
 1988 Kiss My Axe with Al Di Meola Project (Tomato)
 1991 World Sinfonia (Tomato)
 1993 Heart of the Immigrants (Mesa)
 1994 Orange and Blue (Bluemoon)
 1995 The Rite of Strings with Stanley Clarke, Jean-Luc Ponty
 1996 The Guitar Trio with John McLaughlin, Paco de Lucia (Verve)
 1996 Di Meola Plays Piazzolla (Bluemoon)
 1998 The Infinite Desire (Telarc)
 1999 Winter Nights (Telarc)
 2000 World Sinfonía III – The Grande Passion (Telarc)
 2002 Flesh on Flesh (Telarc)
 2005 Cosmopolitan Life with Leonid Agutin (Ole)
 2006 Vocal Rendezvous (SPV)
 2006 Consequence of Chaos (Telarc)
 2007 Diabolic Inventions and Seduction for Solo Guitar (In-Akustik)
 2007 Live in London
 2008 World Sinfonia – La Melodia
 2008 He and Carmen with Eszter Horgas
 2010 One Night in Montreal (Jazz Hour)
 2011 Pursuit of Radical Rhapsody (Telarc)
 2013 All Your Life: A Tribute to the Beatles Recorded at Abbey Road Studios, London
 2015 Elysium (In-Akustik)
 2017 Morocco Fantasia (In-Akustik)
 2018 Elegant Gypsy & More Live (Ear Music)
 2018 Opus (Ear Music)
 2020 Across the Universe  (Ear Music)
 2022 Saturday Night in San Francisco

References

External links

 Official site
 Al Di Meola Interview - NAMM Oral History Library (2015)

1954 births
Living people
20th-century American guitarists
21st-century American guitarists
American jazz guitarists
Jazz fusion guitarists
Jazz-rock guitarists
Lead guitarists
Return to Forever members
Columbia Records artists
American jazz musicians
Latin jazz guitarists
Berklee College of Music alumni
Bergenfield High School alumni
American people of Italian descent
People from Bergenfield, New Jersey
Musicians from Jersey City, New Jersey
People from Old Tappan, New Jersey
Guitarists from New Jersey
American male guitarists
20th-century American male musicians
21st-century American male musicians
American male jazz musicians